Mulberry Plantation is a historic plantation property in rural Berkeley County, South Carolina.  Located between Moncks Corner and Charleston, this property was developed in 1714 by Thomas Broughton, who became the Royal governor of South Carolina, and is one of the oldest plantation homes in the United States.  Its rice fields, dikes and canals were well-preserved into the 20th century.  The plantation house and ten surrounding acres were declared a National Historic Landmark in 1963.

Description and history
Mulberry Plantation is set on the southern shore of the Cooper River, between it and Old United States Route 52.  The main house is a two-story brick building, with a gambrel roof.  At each corner of the main block stand engaged single-story square pavilions, topped by pyramidal roofs.  The main entrance is sheltered by a gabled portico.

The plantation was probably established around 1714, but may not have been founded until 1725, and was built in what was at the time a frontier area on the site of a fortification for defense against Native American attack.  This plantation was used as a defensive site during the Yamasee War (1715–17).  The plantation house is a rare little-altered example of high-style early Georgian architecture in the nation.

Lawrence A. Walker of Summerville, South Carolina, bought the property in 1946 from Clarence E. Chapman of New York, and G. Everett Hoyt of Fairfield, Connecticut paid $175,000 for the house, including 1,027 acres, along with personal property in 1953. A later owner, Charles A. Atkins, was indicted in federal court over bogus tax schemes, and he transferred the house to his wife. Atkins had himself acquired the house from Fannie H. Brawley and William J. Iselin for $2,300,565. The Historic Foundation of Charleston bought the 800-acre plantation in August 1987 to prevent its possible development. The Foundation paid $2,800,000, and resold the property for $2,550,000 in August 1988 to S. Parker Gilbert, a New York City investment banker, and his wife. The Foundation expanded its pre-existing easements on the property to prevent any subdivisions of the property, protect a two-mile entry road, and preserve the interior of the house.

See also

List of National Historic Landmarks in South Carolina
National Register of Historic Places listings in Berkeley County, South Carolina

References

External links
 "Slave Houses, Mulberry Plantation, South Carolina, ca. 1800", Slavery Images: A Visual Record of the African Slave Trade and Slave Life in the Early African Diaspora
Mulberry Plantation, Berkeley County (off U.S. Hwy. 52, Moncks Corner vicinity), at South Carolina Department of Archives and History
Mulberry Plantation, within NPS online book
 

National Historic Landmarks in South Carolina
Houses in Berkeley County, South Carolina
Houses completed in 1714
Historic American Buildings Survey in South Carolina
Houses on the National Register of Historic Places in South Carolina
National Register of Historic Places in Berkeley County, South Carolina
1714 establishments in South Carolina
Plantations in South Carolina
Plantation houses in South Carolina